Ramón José Sender Garcés (3 February 1901 – 16 January 1982) was a Spanish novelist, essayist and journalist. Several of his works were translated into English by the distinguished zoologist, Sir Peter Chalmers Mitchell, including Seven Red Sundays (Siete domingos rojos), Mr Witt Among the Rebels (Mr Witt en el cantón) and The War in Spain (Contraataque). During the Spanish Civil War Sender was among the contributors of El Mono Azul, a Republican literary magazine.

Sender's son is the composer and writer Ramón Sender. One of his several grandchildren is Sol Sender, a designer best known for his work on the Obama campaign logo.

Publications

In Spanish
 Imán (1930)
 Siete domingos rojos (1932)
 Mr. Witt en el cantón (1935)
 Contraataque (1937)
 El lugar de un hombre (1939)
 Mexicayotl (1940)
 Crónica del alba (1942)
 La esfera (1947)
 El rey y la reina (1949) (Originally published in 1948 in English)
 El verdugo afable (1952)
 Mosén Millán (1953) (republished later in 1960 renamed as Requiem por un campesino español)
 Bizancio (1956)
 La tesis de Nancy (1962)
 El bandido adolescente (1965)
 La aventura equinoccial de Lope de Aguirre (1968)

In English translation
 Mr. Witt Among the Rebels (1937); original Spanish: Mr. Witt en el cantón
 Seven Red Sundays (1938); original Spanish: Siete domingos rojos
 The War in Spain: A Personal Narrative (1937); original Spanish: Contraataque
 Chronicle of Dawn (1945); original Spanish: Crónica del alba
 The King and the Queen (1948)
 Requiem for a Spanish Peasant (1960); original Spanish: Requiem por un campesino español
 The Affable Hangman (1964); original Spanish: El verdugo afable

References

Further reading

External links
Profile 
Biography 
Ramón J. Sender: One of the most important Spanish  expatriate writers 

1901 births
1982 deaths
People from Bajo Cinca
Spanish anarchists
Spanish male writers
Aragonese writers
Spanish people of the Spanish Civil War (Republican faction)
Exiles of the Spanish Civil War in France
Exiles of the Spanish Civil War in Mexico
Exiles of the Spanish Civil War in the United States